The 2006–07 Sunshine Tour was the seventh season of professional golf tournaments since the southern Africa based Sunshine Tour was rebranded in 2000.  It marked the last year of a seasonal calendar. The Sunshine Tour represents the highest level of competition for male professional golfers in the region.

In 2005–06 there had been 21 tournaments. Of those, two tournaments were last held in 2005, but there were eight tournaments added for the 2006–07 schedule bringing the total up to 27.  The tour was based predominantly in South Africa, with 24 of the 27 tournaments being held in the country. One event each was held in Swaziland, Zambia and Namibia. The new tournaments were the Stanbic Zambia Open, which returned after a hiatus in 2005, two South African Airways Pro-Am Invitational tournaments, the Sun Coast Classic, the Eskom Power Cup, the Coca-Cola Charity Championship, the first sanctioned year of the Nedbank Golf Challenge, and the Joburg Open which was co-sanctioned by the European Tour.

As usual, the tour consisted of two distinct parts, commonly referred to as the "Summer Swing" and "Winter Swing". Tournaments held during the Summer Swing generally had much higher prize funds, attracted stronger fields, and were the only tournaments on the tour to carry world ranking points, with three events being co-sanctioned with the European Tour.

With the switch to a calendar-based schedule in 2007, the last five events of the 2006–07 season were also considered part of the 2007 schedule, and counted towards the final standings of both.

The Order of Merit was won for the third straight time by Charl Schwartzel.

Schedule 
The following table lists official events during the 2006–07 season.

Order of Merit 
The Order of Merit was based on prize money won during the season, calculated in South African rand.

Ernie Els was the highest money winner (with R1,734,659.33) but did not qualify for the Order of Merit, having only played in three events. Álvaro Quirós was second in the money list (with R1,497,033.00) thanks to his victory in the Alfred Dunhill Championship, but as a non-tour member and having not entered sufficient events, he was also ineligible for the Order of Merit.

Notes

References

External links 

Sunshine Tour
Sunshine Tour
Sunshine Tour